Nadir Latif İslam (1930 – 19 January 2023) was a Turkish lawyer and politician. A member of the Justice Party, he served in the Grand National Assembly from 1973 to 1977.

İslam died in Sakarya Province on 19 January 2023.

References

1930 births
2023 deaths
Deputies of Sakarya
Members of the 15th Parliament of Turkey
Justice Party (Turkey) politicians
Ankara University Faculty of Law alumni
People from Adapazarı